The Women's 4 × 200 metre freestyle relay competition of the 2014 FINA World Swimming Championships (25 m) was held on 3 December.

Records
Prior to the competition, the existing world and championship records were as follows.

The following records were established during the competition:

Results

Heats
The heats were held at 12:52.

Final
The final was held at 19:32.

References

Women's 4 x 200 metre freestyle relay
2014 in women's swimming